This is a list of English-language book publishers. It includes imprints of larger publishing groups, which may have resulted from business mergers. Included are academic publishers, technical manual publishers, publishers for the traditional book trade (both for adults and children), religious publishers, and small press publishers, among other types. The list includes defunct publishers. It does not include businesses that are exclusively printers/manufacturers, vanity presses (publishing and distributing books for a fee), or book packagers.

0–9

 1517 Media – official publishing house of the Evangelical Lutheran Church in America
 37 INK – an imprint of Atria

A

 A & C Black – now an imprint of Bloomsbury Publishing
 A. C. McClurg
 A. S. Barnes & Co. founded by Alfred Smith Barnes
 Abilene Christian University Press
 Ablex Publishing – an imprint of Elsevier
 Abrams Books
 Academic Press – UK publisher; now an imprint of Elsevier
 Ace Books – an imprint of Penguin Group
 Addison-Wesley – an imprint of Pearson Education
 Adis International – an imprint of Wolters Kluwer
 Akashic Books – independent small press; known for its noir series
 Aladdin Paperbacks – a children's fiction imprint of Simon & Schuster
 Alfred A. Knopf
 Allen & Unwin
 Allison & Busby
 Alma Books
 Alyson Books
 American Graphics Institute
 André Deutsch – an imprint of the Carlton Publishing Group
 Andrews McMeel Publishing
 Anova Books – now rebranded as Pavilion Books
 Antenne Books
 Anvil Press Poetry
 Applewood Books
 Apress – technology book publisher
 Arbor House
 Arbordale Publishing
 Arcade Publishing
 Arcadia Publishing – local U.S. history
 Arkham House
 Arktos Media
 Armida Publications
 ArtScroll – an imprint of Mesorah Publications
 Ash-Tree Press
 Athabasca University Press
 Atheneum Books – a children's fiction imprint of Simon & Schuster
 Atheneum Publishers – publisher of political books including the Pulitzer Prize winner The Making of the President 1960
 Atlantic Books
 Atlas Press
 ATOM Books
 Atria Publishing Group – a division of Simon & Schuster a UK-based imprint of Little, Brown
 Aunt Lute Books – feminist publisher (US)
 Austin Macauley Publishers
 Avery Publishing - an imprint of the Penguin Group
 Avon Publications – an imprint of HarperCollins

B

 Baen Books
 Baker Publishing Group
 Ballantine Books
 Banner of Truth Trust – UK-based Christian publisher
 Bantam Books imprint owned by Random House
 Bantam Spectra specialist Sci-Fi imprint of Bantam Books
 Barrie & Jenkins
 Basic Books
 BBC Books
 Belknap Press
 Bella Books
 Bellevue Literary Press
 Bendon Publishing International
 Berg Publishers – now owned by Bloomsbury Publishing
 Berkley Books – an imprint of Penguin Group (USA)
 Bison Books
 Black Dog Publishing
 Black Ink Collective
 Black Library
 Black Sparrow Press
 Black & White Publishing
 Blackie and Son
 Blackstaff Press
 Blackwell Publishing
 Blake Publishing
 Bloodaxe Books
 Bloomsbury Publishing – home of Bloomsbury.com
 Blue Ribbon Books, Garden City, New York
 Bobbs-Merrill Company bought out in 1959 by Howard W. Sams Company
 Bogle-L'Ouverture Publications
 Book League of America
 Book Works
 Booktrope
 Borgo Press – an imprint of Wildside Press
 Boundless
 Bowes & Bowes
 Boydell & Brewer
 Broadside Lotus Press
 Breslov Research Institute
 Brill Publishers
 Brimstone Press – Australian dark-fiction publisher
 Broadview Press
 Burns & Oates – now an imprint of the Continuum International Publishing Group
 Butterworth-Heinemann – UK-based imprint of Elsevier

C

 Caister Academic Press UK
 Cambridge University Press UK
 Canadian Science Publishing
 Candlewick Press
 Canongate Books
 Capstone Publishers
 Carcanet Press, Manchester
 Carlton Publishing Group UK
 Carnegie Mellon University Press
 Casemate Publishers – military history publisher
 Cassava Republic Press
 Cassell
 Cengage
 Central European University Press
 Century an imprint of Random House
 Chambers
 Charles Scribner's Sons
 Chatto & Windus
 Chick Publications
 Chronicle Books
 Churchill Livingstone – an imprint of Elsevier
 Cisco Press
 City Lights Publishers
 Cloverdale Corporation
 Cold Spring Harbor Laboratory Press
 Collector's Guide Publishing
 Collins – now part of HarperCollins
 Columbia University Press
 Concordia Publishing House
 Constable & Co Ltd – now part of Constable & Robinson
 Continuum International Publishing Group – also known as Continuum
 Copper Canyon Press
 Cork University Press
 Cornell University Press
 Coronet Books – a paperback imprint of Hodder & Stoughton
 Counterpoint
 Craftsman Book Company
 CRC Press
 Creative Book Publishers International
 Cresset Press
 Crocker & Brewster
 Crown Publishing Group – a subsidiary of Random House

D

 D. Appleton & Company
 D. Reidel – now part of Springer Science+Business Media
 Da Capo Press – imprint of Perseus Books Group
 Dalkey Archive Press – a small fiction publisher based in Urbana, Illinois
 David & Charles
 DAW Books – science-fiction and fantasy imprint founded by Donald A. Wollheim
 Dedalus Books
 Del Rey Books – a fantasy genre imprint of Random House
 Delacorte Press – an imprint of Random House
 Deseret Book Company
 Dick & Fitzgerald
 Directmedia Publishing
 Disney Publishing Worldwide
 DK
 DNA Publications
 Dobson Books
 Dodd, Mead & Co.
 Dorchester Publishing
 Doubleday – an imprint of Random House
 Douglas & McIntyre – Canadian publishing house
 Dove Medical Press
 Dover Publications
 Dreamspinner Press
 Dundurn Press – Canadian publishing house

E

 E. P. Dutton – split into two imprints; now part of Penguin Group
 Earthscan – publisher of books and journals on environmental issues and renewable energy
 ECW Press
 Eel Pie Publishing
 Elliot Stock
 Ellora's Cave
 Elsevier now part of RELX
 Emerald Group Publishing
 Etruscan Press
 Europa Press
 Everyman's Library
 Ewha Womans University Press
 Exact Change
 Express Publishing

F

 Faber and Faber
 FabJob
 Fairview Press
 Fantagraphics Books
 Farrar, Straus and Giroux – an imprint of Henry Holt and Company
 Felony & Mayhem Press
 Firebrand Books
 Flame Tree Publishing
 Focal Press
 Folio Society
 Forum Media Group
 Four Courts Press
 Four Walls Eight Windows
 Frederick Fell Publishers, Inc.
 Frederick Warne & Co – an imprint of Penguin Group
 Free Press
 Fulcrum Press
 Funk & Wagnalls

G

 G. P. Putnam's Sons
 G-Unit Books
 Gaspereau Press
 Gay Men's Press
 Gefen Publishing House
 George H. Doran Company
 George Newnes
 Godwit Press
 Golden Cockerel Press
 The Good Book Company (UK)
 Good News Publishers
 Goops Unlimited
 Goose Lane Editions
 Grafton
 Graywolf Press
 Greenery Press
 Greenleaf Book Group
 Greenleaf Publishing Ltd
 Greenwillow Books – an imprint of HarperCollins
 Greenwood Publishing Group
 Gregg Press – a Boston, Massachusetts-based imprint of GK Hall & Company
 Grosset & Dunlap – an imprint of Penguin Group
 Grove Atlantic/Grove Press

H

 Hachette Books, formerly Hyperion Books division of Disney Book Group, now a division of Perseus Books Group, a Hachette Book Group unit
 Hachette Book Group USA
 Hackett Publishing Company
 Hamish Hamilton a part of Penguin Books (UK)
 Harbor Mountain Press
 Harcourt Assessment previously the Psychological Corporation; now part of Harcourt Education
 Harcourt originally Harcourt Brace & Company (1919), then Harcourt, Brace & World, Inc. (1960), and Harcourt Brace Jovanovich (HBJ, 1970); now part of Harcourt Education
 Harlequin Enterprises
 Harper became Harper & Row
 Harper & Row now part of HarperCollins
 HarperCollins Publishers
 HarperPrism an imprint of HarperCollins
 HarperTrophy an imprint of HarperCollins
 Harvard University Press
 Harvest House
 Harvill Press at Random House
 Harvill Secker
 Hawthorne Books
 Hay House
 Haynes Manual (UK)
 Headline Publishing Group
 Heinemann an imprint of the Harcourt Education division of RELX
 Hesperus Press
 Hemus
 Heyday Books
 HMSO
 Hodder & Stoughton
 Hogarth Press
 Holland Park Press
 Holt McDougal
 Hoover Institution Press
 Horizon Scientific Press (UK)
 Houghton Mifflin Harcourt
 House of Anansi Press
 The House of Murky Depths (UK)
 Howell-North Books a defunct US publisher of history and Americana
 Humana Press
 Hutchinson

I

 Ian Allan Publishing
 Ignatius Press
 Indiana University Press
 Influx Press
 Informa
 Information Age Publishing 
 Insomniac Press Canada
 International Association of Engineers – Hong Kong
 International Universities Press
 Inter-Varsity Press – IVP UK
 InterVarsity Press – IVP USA
 Ishi Press
 Islamic Texts Society
 Island Press
 Ivyspring International Publisher

J

 J. M. Dent
 Jaico Publishing House
 The Jarrold Group
 The Jewish Publication Society
 John Lane
 John Murray
 Jones & Bartlett Learning a division of Ascend Learning

K

 Karadi Tales – publishes audiobooks and picture books
 Kensington Books
 Kessinger Publishing
 Kluwer Academic Publishers
 Knockabout Comics
 Kodansha – a Japanese publisher which publishes some books in English
 Kogan Page – publishes financial books
 Koren Publishers Jerusalem – publishes Jewish religious texts and works on contemporary Jewish thought
 Korero Press – art book publisher concentrating on graphic design and illustration
 KTAV Publishing House
 Kumarian Press – publishes academic books on international development

L

 Ladybird Books
 Last Gasp
 Leaf Books
 Leafwood Publishers – an imprint of Abilene Christian University Press
 Left Book Club
 Legend Books a San Francisco, California-based imprint of Random House
 Legend Press
 Lethe Press
 Libertas Academica
 Liberty Fund
 Library of America
 Lion Hudson
 Lion Publishing – now a part of Lion Hudson
 Lionel Leventhal
 Lippincott Williams & Wilkins – an imprint of Wolters Kluwer
 Little, Brown and Company
 Liverpool University Press
 Llewellyn Worldwide
 Longman
 LPI Media
 The Lutterworth Press

M

 Macmillan Publishers
 Mainstream Publishing
 Manchester University Press
 Mandrake of Oxford
 Mandrake Press
 Manning Publications
 Manor House Publishing
 Marion Boyars Publishers
 Mark Batty Publisher
 Marshall Cavendish
 Marshall Pickering a Christian imprint of HarperCollins
 Martinus Nijhoff Publishers an imprint of Brill Publishers
 Matthias Media
 McClelland & Stewart
 McFarland & Company 
 McGraw-Hill Education
 Medknow Publications
 Melbourne University Publishing
 Mercier Press Ireland's oldest independent publishing house
 Methuen Publishing
 Michael Joseph
 Michael O'Mara Books
 Michigan State University Press
 Microsoft Press a publishing arm of Microsoft
 The Miegunyah Press
 Miles Kelly Publishing
 Mills & Boon
 Minerva Press
 Mirage Publishing (UK) publishes books on mind, body and spirit, and self-help
 MIT Press
 Mkuki na Nyota
 Modern Library
 Morgan James Publishing
 Mother Tongue Publishing
 Mycroft & Moran an imprint of Arkham House
 Myriad Editions

N

 Naiad Press
 Nauka
 NavPress
 New American Library
 New Beacon Books
 New Directions Publishing
 New English Library
 New Holland Publishers
 New Village Press
 New York Review Books
 New Win Publishing
 Newnes
 No Starch Press
 Nonesuch Press
 Noontide Press
 Northwestern University Press
 Nosy Crow

O

 Oberon Books
 Open Book Publishers
 Open Court Publishing Company
 Open University Press
 OR Books
 Orchard Books
 O'Reilly Media
 Orion Books
 Orion Publishing Group
 Osprey Publishing
 Other Press
 The Overlook Press
 Oxford University Press

P

 Packt
 Palgrave Macmillan
 Pan Books – now Pan Macmillan
 Pantheon Books
 Papadakis Publisher
 Parachute Publishing
 Parragon
 Pathfinder Press
 Paulist Press
 Pavilion Books – UK publisher of illustrated books
 Pecan Grove Press
 Pen and Sword Books
 Pendleton Publishing
 Penguin Books UK
 Penguin Random House UK
 Penn State University Press
 Persephone Books
 Perseus Books Group – American publishing company
 Peter Lang
 Peter Owen Publishers
 Phaidon Press
 Philosophy Documentation Center
 Philtrum Press
 Picador
 Pimlico Books at Random House
 Playwrights Canada Press
 Pluto Press
 Point Blank – an imprint of Wildside Press
 Poisoned Pen Press
 Policy Press
 Polity
 Practical Action
 J. Q. Preble
 Prentice Hall
 Prime Books
 Princeton University Press
 Profile Books
 Progress Publishers
 Prometheus Books
 Puffin Books – an imprint of Penguin Books
 Purple House Press
 Pushkin Press

Q

 The Quarto Group
 Que Publishing
 Quebecor
 Quirk Books

R

 Random House
 Red Circle Authors
 Redstone Press
 Reed Publishing previously A.H. & A.W. Reed
 RELX
 Remington & Co
 Riverhead Books
 Robert Hale London based independent publishing house since 1936
 Robson Books
 Rock Scorpion Books
 Rodopi
 Routledge Kegan Paul now Routledge, an imprint of Taylor & Francis Group publishing
 Rowman & Littlefield
 Royal Society of Chemistry

S

 S&P Global
 SAGE Publishing
 St. Martin's Press
 Salt Publishing
 Sams Publishing
 Samuel French theater/script publishers
 Schocken Books
 Scholastic Corporation
 Scribner
 Seagull Books
 Serif
 Shambhala Publications
 Shire Books
 Shuter & Shooter Publishers
 Sidgwick & Jackson
 Signet Books an imprint of New American Library
 Simon & Schuster
 Sinclair-Stevenson
 Society for Promoting Christian Knowledge
 Sort of Books
 Sounds True
 Sourcebooks
 South End Press
 Spinsters Ink
 Springer Science+Business Media (formally Springer Verlag)
 Square One Publishers
 Stanford University Press
 The Stationery Office – publishers of UK government publications; was the printing arm of the HMSO
 Steidl
 Stein and Day a defunct US publisher
 Summerwild Productions – a Canadian independent book publisher
 Summit Media
 SUNY Press

T

 T&T Clark
 Tachyon Publications
 Tammi, Finland
 Target Books – now part of Virgin Publishing
 Tarpaulin Sky Press
 Tartarus Press
 Tate Publishing & Enterprises
 Taunton Press
 Taylor & Francis
 Ten Speed Press
 Thames & Hudson (UK)
 Thames & Hudson USA
 Thieme Medical Publishers
 Third World Press
 Thomas Nelson
 Three Sirens Press defunct
 Ticonderoga Publications
 Time Inc.
 Times Books
 Titan Books
 Top Shelf Productions
 Tor Books
 Triangle Books – a paperback imprint of Society for Promoting Christian Knowledge
 Troubador Press defunct
 Tupelo Press
 Tuttle Publishing
 Twelveheads Press
 Two Dollar Radio

U

 UCL Press – University College of London Press
 United States Government Publishing Office
 Universal Publishers (United States)
 University of Akron Press
 University of Alabama Press
 University of Alaska Press
 University of British Columbia Press
 University of California Press
 University of Chicago Press
 University of Michigan Press
 University of Minnesota Press
 University of Nebraska Press
 University of Pennsylvania Press
 University of Queensland Press
 University of South Carolina Press
 University of Toronto Press
 University of Wales Press
 The University Press Limited
 University Press of America
 University Press of Kansas
 University Press of Kentucky
 Usborne Publishing

V

 Valancourt Books
 Velázquez Press
 Verso Books
 Victor Gollancz Ltd
 Viking Press – merged with Penguin Group (USA)
 Vintage Books 
 Virago Press
 Virgin Books
 Voyager Books – an imprint of HarperCollins

W

 W. H. Allen & Co. former British publishing house, now absorbed into Virgin Books
 W. W. Norton & Company
 Walter de Gruyter
 Ward Lock & Co
 WBusiness Books
 Weidenfeld & Nicolson
 Well-Trained Mind Press
 Wesleyan University Press
 WestBow Press an imprint of Thomas Nelson
 Westminster John Knox Press
 Wildside Press
 Wiley 
 William Edwin Rudge
 William B. Eerdmans Publishing Company
 Windgate Press
 Wipf and Stock
 Wisdom Publications
 Witherby Publishing Group
 Woodhead Publishing
 Wordfarm
 Workman Publishing Company
 World Publishing Company
 World Scientific
 Wrecking Ball Press
 Wrox Press publishes IT manuals and technology tutorials; an imprint of Wiley
 WSOY, Finland

X

 Xoanon Publishing

Y

 Yale University Press

Z

 Zed Books
 Ziff Davis
 Zondervan

See also

 List of English language small presses
 List of group-0 ISBN publisher codes
 List of group-1 ISBN publisher codes
 List of largest UK book publishers (publishers grouped by principal imprints).
 List of publishers of children's books
 List of self-publishing companies
 List of university presses
 List of women's presses

References

English Language Book
Literature lists
B